The 2021 Safari Rally (also known as the Safari Rally Kenya 2021) was a motor racing event for rally cars that was held over four days between 24 and 27 June 2021. It marked the sixty-eighth running of the Safari Rally. The event was the sixth round of the 2021 World Rally Championship, World Rally Championship-2 and World Rally Championship-3. The 2021 event was based in Nairobi in the Nairobi County and was contested over eighteen special stages totalling  in competitive distance.

Colin McRae and Nicky Grist were the overall reigning rally winners, but they did not defend their titles. Ford World Rally Team, the team they drove for in 2002, when Safari Rally held a World Rally Championship event last time, were the defending manufacturers' winners.

Sébastien Ogier and Julien Ingrassia won the rally. Their team, Toyota Gazoo Racing WRT, were the manufacturer's winners. There were no classified finishers in the World Rally Championship-2 category. Local hero Onkar Rai and Drew Sturrock won the World Rally Championship-3 category.

At the age of ninety-one, Polish driver Sobiesław Zasada became the oldest competitor to start a World Rally Championship event.

Background

Championship standings prior to the event
Reigning World Champions Sébastien Ogier and Julien Ingrassia entered the round with an eleven-point lead over Elfyn Evans and Scott Martin. Thierry Neuville and Martijn Wydaeghe were third, a further eighteen points behind. In the World Rally Championship for Manufacturers, Toyota Gazoo Racing WRT held a massive a forty-nine-point lead over defending manufacturers' champions Hyundai Shell Mobis WRT, followed by M-Sport Ford WRT.

In the World Rally Championship-2 standings, Andreas Mikkelsen and Ola Fløene held a two-point lead ahead of Mads Østberg and Torstein Eriksen in the drivers' and co-drivers' standings respectively, with Marco Bulacia Wilkinson and Marcelo Der Ohannesian in third. In the teams' championship, Movisport and Toksport WRT co-led the championship, with M-Sport Ford WRT in third.

In the World Rally Championship-3 standings, Yohan Rossel and Alexandre Coria lead drivers' and co-drivers' championship respectively. Kajetan Kajetanowicz and Maciek Szczepaniak were second, trailed by Nicolas Ciamin and Yannick Roche.

Entry list
The following crews entered the rally. The event was opened to crews competing in the World Rally Championship, its support categories, the World Rally Championship-2 and World Rally Championship-3, and privateer entries that are not registered to score points in any championship. Eleven entries for the World Rally Championship were received, as were four in the World Rally Championship-2 and six in the World Rally Championship-3.

Route

Itinerary
All dates and times are EAT (UTC+3).

Report

World Rally Cars

Classification

Special stages

Championship standings

World Rally Championship-2

Classification

Special stages

Championship standings

World Rally Championship-3

Classification

Special stages

Championship standings

Notes

References

External links

   
 2021 Safari Rally at eWRC-results.com
 The official website of the World Rally Championship

2021 in Kenyan sport
Safari
June 2021 sports events in Africa
2021